The 1965 South Africa rugby union tour of Scotland and Ireland  was a short series of matches played in April 1965 by South Africa national rugby union team.

It was not a successful tour. The Springboks, lost both test matches against Ireland and Scotland.

Matches of the tour
Scores and results list South Africa's points tally first.

South Africa national rugby team tours of Europe
Springbok tour
Rugby union tours of Ireland
Rugby union tours of Scotland
1964–65 in Irish rugby union
1964–65 in Scottish rugby union
Sports scandals in Scotland
Sports scandals in Ireland
Rugby union and apartheid